Bellinger is a German surname, with popular variants such as Ballinger and Balinger. Notable people with the surname include:

Bob Bellinger (1913–1955), American football player
Charles B. Bellinger (1839–1905), American judge
Clay Bellinger (born 1968), American baseball player
Cody Bellinger (born 1995), American baseball player
Daniel Bellinger (born 2000), American football player
Eric Bellinger (born 1986), American singer, songwriter, and record producer
Gene Bellinger (born 1948), American systems thinker
Gerhard J. Bellinger (born 1931), German theologian
Jeff Bellinger (21st century), American creator of Killer Bunnies and the Quest for the Magic Carrot
John B. Bellinger III (21st century), United States Senate lawyer
Joseph Bellinger (1773–1830), American politician
Katrin Bellinger (born 1958), London-based German art dealer
Patrick N. L. Bellinger (1885–1962), American aviator
Peter Bellinger (1726–1813), American militiaman
Robert Bellinger (1910–2002), British politician
Tony Bellinger (born 1957), American soccer coach
Trudy Bellinger (21st century), British music video director

German-language surnames